Lalitpur District may refer to:

Lalitpur District, India, a district in Uttar Pradesh, India
Lalitpur District, Nepal, a district in the Bagmati Province, Nepal

District name disambiguation pages